Qomsheh-ye Lor Zanganeh (also Romanized as Qomsheh-ye Lor Zanganeh; also known as Lūr-i-Zengeneh) is a village in Mahidasht Rural District, Mahidasht District, Kermanshah County, Kermanshah Province, Iran. At the 2006 census, its population was 258, in 58 families.

Notable people 

 Yaqub Maydashti

References 

Populated places in Kermanshah County